Maksim Aleksandrovich Glushenkov (born 28 July 1999) is a Russian football player who plays for FC Lokomotiv Moscow and the Russia national team. He plays as a right winger or centre forward.

Club career
He made his debut in the Russian Professional Football League for FC Chertanovo Moscow on 29 July 2016 in a game against FC Kaluga.

On 8 January 2019, FC Spartak Moscow officially announced that Glushenkov signed the contract with the club.

He made his Russian Premier League debut for Spartak on 17 March 2019 in a game against FC Zenit Saint Petersburg.

On 21 February 2020, he joined PFC Krylia Sovetov Samara on loan until the end of the 2019–20 season.

On 2 February 2021, he was loaned to FC Khimki until the end of the 2020–21 season.

On 23 July 2021, he was again loaned by PFC Krylia Sovetov Samara until the end of the 2021–22 season. On 25 June 2022, Glushenkov returned to Krylia Sovetov on a permanent basis and signed a three-year contract.

On 28 December 2022, Glushenkov signed a four-year contract with FC Lokomotiv Moscow.

International career
Glushenkov was called up to the Russia national football team for the first time for a friendly against Kyrgyzstan in September 2022. He made his debut in that game on 24 September 2022.

Career statistics

References

External links
 

1999 births
Sportspeople from Smolensk
Living people
Russian footballers
Association football forwards
Russia youth international footballers
Russia under-21 international footballers
Russia international footballers
FC Chertanovo Moscow players
FC Spartak-2 Moscow players
FC Spartak Moscow players
PFC Krylia Sovetov Samara players
FC Khimki players
FC Lokomotiv Moscow players
Russian Premier League players
Russian First League players
Russian Second League players